Lalgun is a village in the Satara district of  the state of Maharashtra in India. It is located on Pusegaon-Phaltan State Highway and comes under Koregaon assembly constituency and Satara Parliamentary constituency. Lalgun has a population of about 2930.

History 
Lalgun has existed for a long time. Warghat Prant(country above the ghats) was under the control of Chhatrapati Shivaji. Later, during the reign of 
Chhatrapati Shahu-I, the Warghat Province from Wai to Kopal on the Tungabhadra was placed under Dattaji Pant Waknis. Chhatrapati Shahu-I's Jabita Swarajya i.e. a Statement of Swarajya (dated 9 September 1718) enumerated the list of provinces in which Warghat province was consists of 16 Subhas. Under the Subha Prant Khatao there were  11 Talukas viz Khatao, Malawadi, Wangi, Nimsod, Mayani, Lalgun, Aundh, Vita, Khanapur, Kaledhon & Bhalwani. During the time of Peshwa the qasaba Lalgun-Budh panchgaon was under the supervision of the Watandars. The British also ruled this region till independence of India. In 1871-72, British administration opened a school at Lalgun.

Geography 
Lalgun is located 17.779N, 74.294E, approximately 38 km east of Satara city  and 120 km from Swargate (Pune). It has an average elevation of 832 metres (2,730 feet) and surrounded by mountainous region of the Sahyadri. Geomorphologically, Lalgun forms the part of Deccan Plateau, which is composed of basalt rock.

Lalgun is situated on the banks of the Yerla River, a tributary of Krishna River. The Yerla River is the lifeline of this village, and fulfills its agricultural water demands. The Ner Dam on the Yerla River lies about 3 km south of Lalgun, and was completed in 1881. The Taluka Headquarters (Tehsil Office) of Lalgun is located about 35 km away at Vaduj (Khatav).

Agriculture 
The main economic activities of this village are agriculture and animal husbandry. Major crops are Soybean, Common beans, Potato, Onion, Jowar, etc. Recently some watershed development has increased the area under sugarcane cultivation. Hence this village is also famous for Jaggery processing.

In popular culture 
 Lalgun is famous for the Nagnath Yatra held every year in the month of Shravan. This yatra is observed at Nagnath Temple at Nagnathwadi near Lalgun. This shrine has equal importance of Lord Shiva and Nag devtas. The festival of Rama Navami is also celebrated every year by the people of Lalgun. 
 Lalgun is famous for its Jangi Kusti Maidan (Mega Wrestling event), which is held every year on the occasion of Vetalba Yatra in Baisakh (in the month of May)  
 Army jawan Subedar Krishnat Narayan Ghadge from Lalgun performed duty as part of Operation Vijay during the 1999 Kargil War and was martyed.
 Lalgun is the native village of Kailash Katkar, the founder and CEO of 'Quick Heal' a famous multinational software company headquartered in Pune and Nikhil Navanath Ghadge, the City Secretary of Nationalist Youth Congress Party, PCMC, Pune.

Nearby Tourist Places 

Some famous tourist places in and around Lalgun are:
 Shri Nagnath Temple, Nagnathwadi (Lalgun)- 2.5 km
 Ner Dam, Ner- 4 km
 Shri Sevagiri Maharaj Temple, Pusegaon- 11 km
 Vardhangad Fort- 10 km
 Rewalkarwadi-Visapur Wind Park- 16 km
 Shri Bhavani Museum & Library, Aundh- 31 km
 Mayani Bird Sanctuary, Mayani- 56 km
 Kaas Pathar (UNESCO World Heritage sites)- 64 km
 Panchgani hill station- 70 km

Transport 
Lalgun is located on the Pusegaon-Phaltan State Highway. The NH-548C Satara-Baitul National Highway connecting Satara passes at a distance of 8 km from Lalgun. MSRTC buses are available from here to Vaduj, Satara, Phaltan, Pune, Shirdi and Mumbai. Koregaon Railway station is 22 km away and Wathar Railway station is 26 km away from Lalgun. Pune International Airport is 125 km away.

Education 
In Lalgun, the facility of education is available in both Marathi and English medium till class 10th. A government school was started at Lalgun on 1st June 1871. Lalgun is also famous for private academies for career in Police and Defense.
    
Schools
 Z.P. Central Primary School
 Shri Ram Vidya Mandir
 Little Angels English Medium School
 Royal Career Academy
 Lakshya Career Academy

References 

Villages in Satara district